Khvoabad (also Romanized as Khvoābād) is a village in Shirvan Rural District, in the Central District of Borujerd County, Lorestan Province, Iran. At the 2006 census, its population was 34, in 9 families.

References 

Towns and villages in Borujerd County